The Regina Vasorum or Queen of Vases is a 4th-century BC hydria from Cumae depicting Eleusinian divinities with gilded flesh in polychrome relief. It is held in the collections of the Hermitage Museum, St. Petersburg. In addition to its aesthetic qualities, it is valued as an iconographical source for ancient Greek religion.

The Regina Vasorum is a "spectacular" and unusually large example of technical experimentation among Greek potters after the red-figure style had run its course. The figures were made separately, painted, and gilded, then attached to the vase with slip, possibly by sprigging.

See also
 South Italian ancient Greek pottery

Sources
 Elena Ananitch, Lucanian Vases («L'Erma» di Bretschneider, 2005), p. 7 online.
 Kevin Clinton, Greek Sanctuaries, p. 92 online.
 Beth Cohen, The Colors of Clay: Special Techniques in Athenian Vases (J. Paul Getty Museum, 2006), p. 115.
 Erika Simon, Festivals of Attica: An Archaeological Commentary (University of Wisconsin Press, 1983), passim.

External links
 Color photo of the Regina Vasorum at the website of the Hermitage Museum

References

Ancient Greek pottery
Individual ancient Greek vases
Eleusinian Mysteries
Archaeological collections of the Hermitage Museum
4th-century BC artefacts